Nudix hydrolase 17 is a protein that in humans is encoded by the NUDT17 gene.

References

Further reading 

Nudix hydrolases